Kazuki Takahashi (1961–2022) was a Japanese manga artist and game creator.

Kazuki Takahashi may also refer to:

 Kazuki Takahashi (footballer, born 1996)
 Kazuki Takahashi (footballer, born 1999)